Joseph Jordan (born 15 December 1951) is a Scottish football player, coach and manager. He was most recently a first-team coach at AFC Bournemouth.

A former striker, he played for Leeds United, Manchester United, and Milan, among others at club level, as well making 52 appearances and scoring 11 goals for Scotland. As a player, he gained a fearsome 'Jaws' persona due to having lost two front teeth early in his career. The persona aside, he became known as a strong, fearless and committed player, with skill to match, and good aerial abilities. He was part of the successful Leeds United team of the 1970s, winning the 1973–74 Football League First Division title. Cup success was elusive however, being a losing finalist with Leeds in the 1973 European Cup Winners' Cup final and 1975 European Cup final, and the 1979 FA Cup final with Manchester United. At international level he is the only Scottish player to score in three World Cups, in 1974, 1978 and 1982.

After retiring from playing, Jordan moved into coaching and management, at a number of clubs, most notably managing Heart of Midlothian in Scotland before later becoming first-team coach at Portsmouth under Harry Redknapp, with whom he has since developed a close working relationship, later following him to Tottenham Hotspur. In coaching and management he is described by Redknapp and others as an enigmatic coach who bears listening to, who has lost none of his 'hard man' reputation as a player.

For his efforts for club and country as a player, he was inducted into the Scottish Football Hall of Fame in 2005. He is considered a legend among the Tartan Army of Scotland fans, being best remembered for scoring the crucial goal against Czechoslovakia in 1973 which ensured Scotland qualified for their first World Cup finals in 16 years.

Early life
Jordan was born in the village of Cleland, Lanarkshire (sometimes given as the nearby town of Carluke). After leaving school, Jordan became an apprentice draughtsman. At age 15, Jordan had also begun playing for the Scottish Junior Football Association club, Blantyre Victoria.

Club career

Morton
Jordan began his professional career in 1968 at Morton. He initially played for Morton part-time. Jordan moved to Leeds for £15,000 in 1970.

Leeds United
There was little prospect of Jordan making first-team, as the partnership of Allan Clarke and Mick Jones was a well established and successful duo. In 1973, he made 16 League starts and scoring nine goals. However, he was left out of the team that contested the FA Cup final against Sunderland which Leeds lost 1–0. Don Revie would select him for the 1973 European Cup Winners' Cup Final played on 16 May against Milan, another 1–0 defeat. Jordan was a regular in the following season, as Leeds coasted to the League title. He scored seven goals in 25 League games.

By 1974, Jordan was Leeds' main target man, providing many knock downs for Peter Lorimer to volley. Alongside other Scottish players at Leeds, Jordan formed part of the so called 'Scottish mafia'; namely goalkeeper David Harvey (1965–1980, 1982–1984), defender Gordon McQueen (1972–1978), midfielder Billy Bremner (1959–1976), left winger Eddie Gray (1965–1983) and right winger Peter Lorimer (1963–1979, 1983–1986). Jordan was the Leeds number 9 in the team which lost the 1975 European Cup Final 2–0 to Bayern Munich, described as the last hurrah for Revie's Leeds team. With Leeds in decline, Jordan moved to Manchester United in January 1978 for £350,000. His final league record for Leeds was 39 goals from 135 games. His Leeds and Scotland colleague Gordon McQueen soon followed. The deal set a new transfer fee record for a transfer between two English clubs.

Manchester United
As the new Manchester United number 9, Jordan reached the 1979 FA Cup final, ultimately losing 3–2 to the north London club Arsenal. During a 1980 FA Cup third round replay at Old Trafford, Jordan clashed with Tottenham goalkeeper Milija Aleksic, dislocating Alexsic's jaw. The Independent in 2011 described this as a revenge act for Aleksic having repeatedly been charging Jordan during corners. It became known as the game that saw Tottenham's best player Glenn Hoddle have to play in goal. He remained at Old Trafford until 1981, when he moved to Italy to Milan.

Milan
Jordan spent two seasons playing for Milan, scoring 12 goals in 52 league games. This was the 1981–82 season in the Italian top division, Serie A, and the 1982–83 season in Italian second division, Serie B. In his first season, he scored 2 goals in 22 league games, but after a bad run of results, the club was relegated to Serie B as the third last finishers in Serie A, 1-point behind Genoa. In the second season he scored 10 goals in 30 league games, and the club returned to Serie A, being promoted as Serie B champions, 8 points ahead of Lazio. In all competitions, Jordan was joint top-scorer for the club, with 6 goals alongside Roberto Antonelli in the first season, and 14 alongside Aldo Serena in the second season.

On the eve of a return to the club in a Champions League game in 2011, as a coach with Tottenham, Jordan said the move to Milan, one of the biggest clubs in the world, was the best move of his career, and it gave him a chapter in it that he had always wanted, a chance to play abroad.

Hellas Verona
After two seasons with Milan, instead of playing again in Serie A with them, Jordan moved to another Italian club Hellas Verona of the northern city of Verona. While Milan had been in Serie B for Jordan's last season there, Verona had finished fourth in the 1982–83 Serie A, earning a place in the UEFA Cup. The next season, both clubs finished the 1983–84 Serie A in equal sixth place.

Having caught the eye of Verona for his brave, strong and combative performance in Serie B for Milan, they sought to use Jordan's strength to play up front alongside the up and coming players Maurizio Iorio or Giuseppe Galderisi, who were fast and nimble but lacked strength, and were thought to be unable to play together, being an 'odd-couple'. From the start of the season Jordan played 24 games, 12 in the league, but only scored 2 goals, 1 in the league, 1 in the Italian Cup. This poor form ultimately led Verona to drop Jordan and settle on the pairing of Iorio and Galderisi until the end of the season, with Jordan returning to England after that one season, credited at least with having passed on valuable experience to Iorio and Galderisi and other young players at the club.

Later career
On his return to England, Jordan joined south coast club Southampton for a fee of £150,000. During his time at The Dell Jordan gave everything to the Saints' cause, despite being in the autumn of his career. He remained with the club until February 1987, by when he had lost his place to Colin Clarke. He was then given a free transfer to Bristol City, where he finished his playing days, and was briefly player-manager.

At his retirement from playing, Jordan had made a total of 456 club appearances. In 2011, he described his three seasons in Italy as the best experience of his career.

International career

On 19 May 1973, three days after appearing in the European Cup Winners Cup final for Leeds, Jordan played his first game for the Scotland national team, a 1–0 defeat to England at Wembley. In 1973, as part of the qualification campaign for the 1974 World Cup to be held in West Germany, Jordan scored with a flying header in what turned out to be a crucial winning goal, in a 2–1 win against Czechoslovakia at Hampden Park in Glasgow. Securing Scotland a place at the finals, this was the first time they had qualified for the World Cup since 1958, failing at three previous attempts.

Jordan earned nine more Scotland caps by the end of the 1973–74 season, scoring two goals on the way, which saw him be selected for the finals. At the 1974 World Cup, Jordan scored the second goal in a 2–0 win over Zaire in the first group game, and a last minute equaliser in a 1–1 draw with Yugoslavia. Scotland finished the group unbeaten, but went out of the competition at the group stage on goal difference.

In the second to last game of the qualification campaign for the 1978 World Cup to be held in Argentina, Jordan won a controversial penalty against their opponents Wales, said to have helped Scotland to qualify at their expense. Jordan and the Welsh defender David Jones went to challenge for the ball in the Welsh penalty area, from a throw-in by Scotland midfielder Asa Hartford. The referee decided Jones had handled the ball, and awarded Scotland a penalty, although TV replays later showed that it was in fact Jordan's hand which made contact with the ball (and also that he kissed his hand once the penalty was awarded). The penalty was converted, and the eventual 2–0 win for Scotland secured qualification by winning UEFA Group 7. He was selected by Ally MacLeod in the Scotland squad for the 1978 World Cup in Argentina. Jordan scored the opening goal in their first match against Peru, but Scotland went on to lose 3–1. Scotland again failed to qualify beyond the group stage, after a 1–1 draw with Iran and a 3–2 win against the Netherlands.

Jordan was again selected for the Scotland squad in the 1982 World Cup. Scotland once again failed to progress beyond the group stages, but a personal milestone was achieved when he scored in the 2–2 draw against the Soviet Union. This meant that Jordan had scored in three successive World Cup Finals. Unfortunately he was injured in the same match, and never played for his country again. In total, Jordan earned 52 international caps, scoring 11 goals, and is the only Scottish player to have scored in three World Cups.

Coaching and management career

Bristol City
Moving into management, Jordan's first job was at Bristol City which saw the club reach the semi-finals of the League cup. He managed the club from March 1988 to September 1990, for 134 games. During this time, he initially struggled in his first season in charge, but following a number of key signings – most notably Bob Taylor, from Leeds – he took City to promotion in the 1989–90 season, finishing second behind local rivals Bristol Rovers.

Hearts
In 1990 Jordan was appointed manager of the Scottish Premier Division club Heart of Midlothian, based in the capital, Edinburgh. After a poor start to the 1990 campaign, Hearts had sacked their manager of eight years Alex MacDonald, and turned to Jordan as a high profile ex-Scotland international striker. He took charge of the club from 10 September.

Jordan guided Hearts to second place in the Premier Division, and to two Scottish Cup semi-finals. With 63 points from 44 games, the club finished second in the 1991–92 Scottish Premier Division, nine points behind the champions Rangers and one point ahead of third placed Celtic. Hearts led the league for a significant part of the season, losing just two of their first 28 games. In the 1991–92 Scottish Cup they were eliminated in a penalty shoot-out against Airdrieonians, after two drawn matches. In the 1992–93 Scottish Cup they lost 2–1 away to Rangers.

After a poor run in the 1992–93 season, which featured a 6–0 loss to Falkirk, later described by the club as a thrashing, the board sacked Jordan. Jordan left the club on 3 May 1993, having registered 69 wins, 31 draws and 43 losses, from 143 competitive games. Speaking in 2010, Jordan expressed bitterness over his departure from Hearts, asserting he had done "particularly well" and the dismissal was undeserved, but reflecting "That's life, you get on with it, nobody's going to listen to your sad stories, but that was a sore one".

Celtic
After Hearts, in 1993 Jordan became assistant manager to Liam Brady at Celtic, said to be out of an emotional attachment to the club he supported as a boy, and to Brady. Having been in the job since 1991, Brady resigned just four months after Jordan arrived, and he felt obliged to do the same, stating in 2010 that he felt no regrets and that "You've just got to make those calls."

Stoke City
Jordan was appointed manager of Stoke City in November 1993 taking over from fellow Scot Lou Macari who had left to join Celtic. Jordan was not a popular choice amongst the supporters at the Victoria Ground as it looked likely that Denis Smith was to become their manager. They eventually accepted Jordan as the new manager but his style of play soon began to cause grumblings from the terraces but the side slowly got results going if not the quality of football on offer, Stoke finishing the 1993–94 season in 10th position. The 1994–95 season saw no change in the relationship between Jordan and the supporters and it came as little surprise when after a couple of heavy 4–0 defeats he resigned on 8 September 1994. He was replaced by the returning Lou Macari.

Bristol City
Returning to Bristol City for a second spell, he managed the club from November 1994 to March 1997 for another 130 games.

Northern Ireland
Between 1998 and 2000, he was assistant manager to Lawrie McMenemy as they unsuccessfully tried to get Northern Ireland to qualify for the 2000 European Championships.

Huddersfield Town
From December 2000 until May 2002, he was assistant to his former Manchester United team-mate Lou Macari at Huddersfield Town.

Portsmouth
In 2004, after a recommendation, Jordan was brought into the coaching team at Portsmouth by manager Harry Redknapp to work alongside him and his assistant manager, Kevin Bond. Under Redknapp, Jordan went on to win the 2008 FA Cup Final with Portsmouth. They beat Cardiff City 1–0 at Wembley Stadium on 17 May.

While working as a coach under Redknapp at Portsmouth, Jordan said of his career and the possibility of future management roles, with clubs or Scotland, "I'm still ambitious and I'm desperate to do well here, along with the other people...I wouldn't rule [management] out, but I'm not chasing it. I get on well with [Redknapp] and we hope that we can achieve something. I won't go chasing every job that's going, I know what I am and what I can do, but I'm not going down the route of applying for jobs."

Jordan continued to coach the team under the management of Velimir Zajec and Alain Perrin. He took over as caretaker manager for two games in November 2005 after Perrin's departure, before Redknapp returned after resigning from Southampton.

On the morning of 26 October 2008, after agreeing a compensation deal of £5m, Redknapp left Portsmouth to become the new manager of Tottenham Hotspur. This left assistant manager Tony Adams and first-team coach Jordan to take charge of the team for the 1–1 home draw against Fulham the same day.

On the question of whether both would follow him, when he left Redknapp said he believed former Arsenal player Adams would not follow due to the Tottenham-Arsenal rivalry, but said "Joe Jordan has been fantastic for me and I would always be pleased to have him with me anywhere. But he is at Portsmouth at the moment and it is up to him and the club to see what will happen in the future." On his appointment as the permanent Portsmouth manager two days later, Adams said he was keen to keep Jordan, stating "Joe is Portsmouth through and through, he's part of the woodwork, but he's a big man and will make his own decision."

Tottenham
On 7 November 2008 Jordan left Portsmouth to join Redknapp at Tottenham Hotspur as first-team coach, reforming the original Portsmouth back room team after Redknapp had also brought the recently sacked AFC Bournemouth manager Kevin Bond as Tottenham assistant manager. Portsmouth praised Jordan's "significant contribution" on his departure after four years at the club.

Queens Park Rangers
In November 2012, Jordan re-united with Harry Redknapp at Queens Park Rangers as first-team coach.

Middlesbrough
On 17 March 2017, Jordan was appointed as assistant first-team manager under caretaker manager Steve Agnew at Middlesbrough. Jordan left his post at the end of the 2016–17 season.

AFC Bournemouth
On 25 February 2021, AFC Bournemouth announced that Jordan had joined the coaching staff. Jordan left his role after the 2020-21 season, upon the expiration of his contract.

Recognition
In 2005, Jordan was one of 11 players inducted into the Scottish Football Hall of Fame. Having been born in 1951, Jordan was the second youngest of the 2005 inductees, behind the then Rangers manager Alex McLeish, born in 1959, and with the oldest being Charles Campbell, born "circa 1850s". Honouring the "truly great players, managers and officials who have reached the pinnacle of their profession and have made a significant contribution to Scotland's football reputation through their skill, spirit and determination", the induction followed the inaugural 20 Hall of Fame entrants, inducted in November 2004. Citing his "highly successful career at club level" at Leeds, Manchester United and Milan, the Hall of Fame stated Joe would probably be best remembered for his crucial 1973 World Cup qualifying goal against Czechoslovakia.

According to STV in 2010, for his efforts for the Scotland national team as "braveheart Joe", for the "all round bravery and commitment to the cause whenever he [played for Scotland]" and particularly the crucial goal against Czechoslovakia in 1973, and the controversial penalty against Wales in 1977 (described as the 'hand of Joe', in reference to the later infamous Hand of God goal in 1986), Jordan's "status as a Scottish legend is safely assured" among the Tartan Army of Scotland's supporters. According to The Herald, Jordan's hero status took hold with the goal against Czechoslovakia, due to both its significance and the fact it had been seemingly scored "as if it were an act of sheer will."

On the occasion of the 110th anniversary of A.C. Milan, Jordan has been included in the list of the 110 most important players in the history of A.C. Milan .

Jordan is described by The Herald as having crossed two eras in his career – having been a Scottish player at the time they were revered in the English game, he has gone on to coach in England as one of seven Scottish managers or coaches in the Premier League. He attributes this to a common determination and desire to win. In contrast to his playing career, Jordan has lamented the state of the game in Scotland in the late 2000s, which has seen a decline in domestic and international Scottish football, and profile of Scottish players in England, and a drying up of opportunities and even the availability of up and coming local players, contrasted to his era with contemporaries like Asa Hartford, Kenny Dalglish and Danny McGrain.

'Jaws' persona
Jordan was nicknamed Jaws early on in his playing career, due to his lack of front teeth, which had been knocked out. This had occurred in a clash during a Leeds United reserve match. He lost two front teeth after being kicked in the face during a goalmouth scramble. Although they were replaced by dentures, these were removed for safety reasons while playing. Having moved to Milan, in Italy his 'Jaws' nickname was given a local interpretation, becoming known as Lo Squalo (The Shark). Despite the dentures, this association remained with him into management; during the craze of taking novelty inflatables to matches such as bananas etc, when Jordan was manager of Bristol City fans waved giant inflatable teeth. According to The Times writing in 2009, images of Jordan's "ferocious fangs as a player still regularly [appeared in] Scottish newpapers [sic] whenever an excuse can be found to hark back to the game's golden age" Jordan has been involved in several confrontations at the touchline and in the tunnel during his time at Tottenham, including with Roy Hodgson, Paul Ince, Alan Pardew, Andy Woodman, and Gennaro Gattuso.

Jordan himself stated in 2010 that he rejected the caricature that went along with his Jaws persona, stating "I was what I was, but I look back and I had seven years at Leeds, who were one of the top teams in Europe, then I got a transfer to Manchester United, then a transfer to AC Milan. These are top clubs, and I had opportunities to go to Liverpool, Arsenal, Ajax. I'm not saying that to brag; if those teams thought I had something to offer, it was more than having no teeth."

Playing and management style
As one of the nominees for a public vote organised in April 2010 by STV to name 'Scotland's Greatest Team', Jordan was described as an "uncompromising, old fashioned centre forward who was never afraid to put his head where it hurts for club and country", adding that during the 1970s and 1980s "there were few more fearsome sights in world football" than Jordan.

In a 2007 list compiled by The Times Jordan was ranked as the 34th hardest man in the history of the game, with the citation "There have been few more fearsome sights in the European game than 'Jaws' Jordan without his front teeth." David O'Leary, when reflecting on his entire playing career as a defender (spent mostly at Arsenal between 1975 and 1993) he said of Jordan that he was the most combative forward he had ever faced. He has also been described as a powerhouse in aerial play.

Citing his dislocation of Milija Aleksic's jaw in 1980 as an example, The Independent described in 2011 how Jordan was a player who "did not stand for nonsense on the pitch". According to The Herald writing in 2010, alongside his strong play, which due to the way the game was played at that time was almost a necessity if forwards wanted to succeed, Jordan also had a refinement to his game.

Following the clash with Gattuso, playing on his hardman reputation, The Independent listed the "Five reasons not to mess with Joe Jordan". Redknapp has said of Jordan as a coach that "You could put your life on him... He is quiet, but when he says something, it is worth listening to."

In coaching, Jordan is described by The Herald as still having the presence and natural authority he had as a player, and of having an enigmatic solemnity about him. In the same interview, while living in Bristol, Jordan was described as having the intensified Scottish patriotism of an exile, who was willing to seize the opportunity to manage the Scottish national team since 2002.

Personal life
Jordan has two sons who have both played professional football: Tom and Andy (who retired due to injury after leaving Hartlepool United). One of his two daughters lives and works in Italy. He has an interest in fine wines, picked up from his time playing in Italy. Jordan supported Celtic as a boy. As of March 2010, Jordan lived with his family in Bristol.

Career statistics

Club
Sourced from 

A.  The "Other" column constitutes appearances and goals in the European Cup, FA Charity Shield, Football League Trophy, Football League play-offs, Full Members Cup, Inter-Cities Fairs Cup, Screen Sport Super Cup, UEFA Cup and UEFA Cup Winners' Cup.

International

Scores and results list Scotland's goal tally first.

Managerial

Honours
Leeds United
Football League First Division: 1973–74
European Cup runner-up: 1974–75
European Cup Winners' Cup runner-up: 1972–73
FA Charity Shield runner-up: 1974

Manchester United
FA Cup runner-up: 1978–79

Milan
Serie B: 1982–83
Mitropa Cup: 1982

Bristol City
Football League Trophy runner-up: 1986–87

Individual
Scottish Football Hall of Fame, 2005 inductee
Scotland national football team roll of honour: 1982

References

External links

Manchester United career summary
Manchester United career summary

1951 births
Living people
People from Cleland, North Lanarkshire
Scottish footballers
Scotland international footballers
Association football forwards
Blantyre Victoria F.C. players
Greenock Morton F.C. players
Leeds United F.C. players
Manchester United F.C. players
A.C. Milan players
Southampton F.C. players
Bristol City F.C. players
Scottish football managers
Bristol City F.C. managers
Heart of Midlothian F.C. managers
Stoke City F.C. managers
Portsmouth F.C. managers
Premier League managers
Serie A players
Serie B players
English Football League players
Scottish expatriate footballers
Scottish expatriate sportspeople in Italy
Expatriate footballers in Italy
Tottenham Hotspur F.C. non-playing staff
Middlesbrough F.C. non-playing staff
1974 FIFA World Cup players
1978 FIFA World Cup players
1982 FIFA World Cup players
Scottish Football Hall of Fame inductees
Huddersfield Town A.F.C. non-playing staff
English Football League managers
Wikipedia pages semi-protected against vandalism
Celtic F.C. non-playing staff
Footballers from North Lanarkshire
Scotland under-23 international footballers
Scottish Football League managers
FA Cup Final players
Association football coaches